A Diosa (better known as No potho reposare) is a song written in 1920 by the composer Giuseppe Rachel with the time of English Waltz, on the words of the homonymous poem in Logudorese language, written in 1915, by the lawyer Salvatore Sini. 
Since 1921 the song was part of the repertoire of the "Philharmonic Body" of Nuoro, directed by Rachel himself. In 1936 the tenor Maurizio Carta recorded in a 78 rpm, for the Pathé Records, three verses of  A Diosa . In 1957 in Turin, on the initiative of the musician and musicologist Gavino Gabriel, a version of the Coro di Nuoro was recorded. In 1978 Maria Carta recorded the piece in a 45rpm for the Polydor Records.

Other notable recordings
Maria Teresa Cau
Maria Carta
Animas
Duo Puggioni 
Andrea Parodi with Tazenda
 Andrea Parodi with Al Di Meola
 Noa
 Gianna Nannini with Gavino Murgia
 Antonella Ruggiero
 Marco Carta
 Bianca Atzei with Tazenda
 Plácido Domingo

Instrumental versions
 Paolo Fresu, with Jan Lungdren, Lars Daniellson  and Clarence Penn
 Al Di Meola

Symphonic variations 
 Hardy Mertens

See also
Music of Sardinia

References

External links

Sardinian culture
Sardinian folk songs
1936 songs